The 8th BET Awards took place at the Shrine Auditorium in Los Angeles, California on June 24, 2008.  The awards recognized Americans in music, acting, sports, and other fields of entertainment over the past year.  Comedian D. L. Hughley hosted the awards for his first time.

Winners

Performers
Usher 
Young Jeezy (Feat. Kanye West)Keyshia Cole (Feat. Lil' Kim)Ne-YoAlicia Keys (Feat. SWV, En Vogue & TLC)T-PainChris Brown (Dancing with Ciara)Marvin SappJill Scott, Anthony Hamilton, Maxwell, Al Green, RihannaNelly (Feat. Fergie, Jermaine Dupri, Ciara)Lil Wayne (Feat. T-Pain)

References

External links
 Official website

BET Awards